Blake Mills (born September 21, 1986) is an American songwriter, guitarist, producer, and composer based in California.

Biography 
Blake Mills was born in Santa Monica, California, and grew up in Malibu. He attended Malibu High School with Taylor Goldsmith. Mills and Goldsmith began their musical careers in a band they co-founded called Simon Dawes.  Simon Dawes released its debut EP What No One Hears in 2005, and its first LP Carnivore in September 2006 via Record Collection. After the band broke up in 2007, Goldsmith and his younger brother, Griffin, formed the band Dawes with Simon Dawes bassist Wylie Gelber, and Mills went on to serve as a touring guitarist for Jenny Lewis. He went on to tour with Band of Horses, Cass McCombs, Julian Casablancas and Lucinda Williams. As a session musician, Mills has collaborated with Conor Oberst, Kid Rock, Weezer, The Avett Brothers, Paulo Nutini, Norah Jones, Carlene Carter, Jesca Hoop, Dixie Chicks, Zucchero, Pink, Lana Del Rey, Dangermouse, Vulfpeck, and other performers.

In 2010, Mills released his first solo LP, Break Mirrors, via Record Collection.  The original intent for the album was to serve as a calling card for Mills to get session work. Break Mirrors was touted as the album of the year by many websites and fellow musicians, despite its limited release. After spending back-to-back years on tour and in the studio playing on other people’s records, Mills made the decision to begin producing in order to explore musical concepts beyond guitar in late 2011. Analog Edition Records released a Blake Mills double A side 7" in 2011, featuring the songs "Hey Lover" and "Wintersong" in 2011.

In January 2012, Mills appeared on Conan O'Brien for his first national televised performance as a solo artist. He covered Bob Dylan’s “Heart Of Mine,” which he had recently recorded for an Amnesty International benefit CD. Later that year, he went on to co-produce Jesca Hoop's album The House that Jack Built, produced Sara Watkins' album Sun Midnight Sun, wrote and produced "Sad Dream" on Sky Ferreira's latest EP Ghost and an additional two tracks on her upcoming LP I'm Not Alright. Mills was featured on electric slide guitar on the track '"Go Home" from the 2013 debut album from the group Lucius.  For the compilation album Just Tell Me That You Want Me: A Tribute to Fleetwood Mac, he co-produced and played with Billy Gibbons and Matt Sweeney on the track "Oh Well". Mills also served as the opening act and guitarist for Fiona Apple during her 2012 tour through North America. Mills co-produced the track "Artifact 1" on Conor Oberst's album, Upside Down Mountain, which was released in May 2014. He also produced the forthcoming untitled release from Jesca Hoop and Mt. Egypt's III.

Mills released his second full length album, Heigh Ho, on September 16, 2014. This self-produced album combines a range of genres. Along with friends and inspirations including Fiona Apple, Jim Keltner, Don Was, Benmont Tench, Jon Brion, and Mike Elizondo, Mills recorded Heigh Ho at the legendary Ocean Way Recording studios in a room built for Frank Sinatra. He also produced the sophomore release from Alabama Shakes. Recording took place at Sound Emporium in Nashville, a studio originally built for Sun Records house producer Cowboy Jack Clement.

In 2015 Mills was nominated for a Grammy in the category of Producer of the Year, Non-Classical for his work on Alabama Shakes breakthrough album Sound & Color.

Mills' producer credits in 2016 include albums from former bandmates Dawes, along with upcoming albums from John Legend, Laura Marling, Jim James and Perfume Genius. In the same year, he also performed guitar and various other instruments on Andrew Bird's album Are You Serious. In 2017, Mills took part in Randy Newman's Dark Matter as a guitarist.

In November 2018, Mills quietly released an almost-entirely-instrumental EP entitled "Look" on his own label imprint New Deal Music. The album was created almost entirely using Roland guitar synthesizers from the 1970s with collaboration from saxophonist Sam Gendel, singer Natalie Mering of Weyes Blood, and violin and string-arrangement virtuoso, Rob Moose, who has appeared on nearly every release Mills has produced. "Look" was the second release on New Deal Music. The first New Deal release, in September 2018, was a soundtrack by Colin Stetson, Canadian-American saxophonist, multireedist, and composer based in Montreal, for the short-lived dramatic television series The First (TV series).

On December 5, 2019 Mills teased a clip of a new song via an NPR piece by Grayson Haver Currin titled "Songs In An Emergency"  that centers around the urgency of climate change. The new song is from his upcoming and yet-to-be-titled third full-length album; it is entitled "Summer All Over." It is a piano-based ballad musing on the Malibu fires of 2018 and co-written with Cass McCombs. When describing the spacious sound-landscape that the song embodies and the title, Mills commented that "writing about the season of summer inherently evokes a Beach Boys vibe, maybe because I'm in Los Angeles, but the implication of the warmest season happening all over the world at the same time is an 'endless summer." The third full-length is expected to be released in 2020 on New Deal Music with management support by Record Collection and distribution by Verve Label Group, a division of UMG Recordings, Inc.

In 2020, Blake Mills played guitar and harmonium on Bob Dylan's album Rough and Rowdy Ways.

Released March 3, 2023, Blake Mills composed, performed, and produced the American musical drama streaming television miniseries Daisy Jones & The Six's,  album "Aurora"

Mollusk sessions
From time to time Mills hosts invite only musical performances at Mollusk Surf Shop in Venice, California. In previous shows Mills has been accompanied by musicians including Jackson Browne, Billy Gibbons, Matt Sweeney, Cass McCombs, Jenny Lewis, Charlie Sexton, Benmont Tench, Dave Rawlings, Val McCallum, Tal Wilkenfeld, Mike Einziger, Danielle Haim, Smokey Hormel, Michael Elizondo, Anthony Wilson, and Xavier Mas.

Discography

Solo
Break Mirrors (2010) Record Collection
Heigh Ho (2014) Verve Records / Record Collection
Look (2018) New Deal Records
Mutable Set (2020) New Deal Records / Verve Records

Collaborative album
Notes With Attachments (with Pino Palladino) (2021) New Deal / Impulse!

Simon Dawes
What No One Hears EP (2005) Record Collection
Carnivore (2006) Record Collection

Compilation
Chimes of Freedom: The Songs of Bob Dylan Honoring 50 Years of Amnesty International (2012) - Track 4 Disc 2 -"Heart of Mine" - Amnesty International distributed by Fontana

Production credits
 Co-producer – Jesca Hoop – The House That Jack Built (2012) Bella Union 
 Producer – Sara Watkins – Sun Midnight Sun (2012) Nonesuch 
 Producer – Sky Ferreira – Ghost EP (2012) Capitol 
 Co-producer – Billy Gibbons – "Oh Well" – Just Tell Me That You Want Me: A Tribute to Fleetwood Mac (2012) Hear
 Producer – Mt. Egypt – III (2012) Record Collection
 Producer – Conor Oberst – "Artifact 1" – Upside Down Mountain (2014) Nonesuch
 Producer – Fiona Apple – "Container" – The Affair (2014) Showtime
 Producer – Fiona Apple – "Pure Imagination" – (2015) Cultivate / Epic
 Producer – Fiona Apple featuring Maude Maggart – "I'm in the Middle of a Riddle" (2015) Hear
 Producer – Alabama Shakes – Sound & Color (2015) ATO
 Producer – Brittany Howard – "I Feel Free" – Joy (2015) 21st Century Fox
 Producer – Dawes – We're All Gonna Die (2016) HUB Records
 Co-producer – Jim James – Eternally Even (2016) Capitol / ATO
 Producer – John Legend – Darkness & Light (2016) Columbia
 Producer – John Legend featuring Cynthia Erivo "God Only Knows" (2016) Epic
 Producer – Jesca Hoop – Memories Are Now (2017) Sub Pop
 Producer – Laura Marling – Semper Femina (2017) More Alarming
 Producer – Perfume Genius – No Shape (2017) Matador
 Producer – Perfume Genius – Set My Heart On Fire Immediately (2020) Matador
 Producer - Pino Palladino &  Blake Mills - Notes with Attachments (2021) New Deal / Verve
 Producer - Perfume Genius – Ugly Season (2022) Matador
 Producer - Jack Johnson - Meet the Moonlight (2022) Brushfire / Republic
 Producer - Marcus Mumford - Self-Titled (2022) Island

References

American singer-songwriters
Slide guitarists
Avant-garde guitarists
Living people
1986 births
21st-century American singers
21st-century American guitarists
Record Collection artists